The Puebla frog or Pueblan pool frog (Lithobates pueblae) is a species of frog in the family Ranidae endemic to Necaxa River near Huauchinango, Puebla state, Mexico, where it is known as rana poblana. It was thought to probably be extinct until 2010 when Dr. Georg Hantke from the National Museum of Scotland re-discovered it.

Natural habitats of the Puebla frog are pine and pine-oak forests near permanent river systems, its breeding habitat. It is threatened by loss of its river habitat, damming of Necaxa River being an important contributor.

References

Lithobates
Endemic amphibians of Mexico
Fauna of the Sierra Madre Oriental
Taxonomy articles created by Polbot
Amphibians described in 1955